Jesús Santa Rodríguez (born 1964) is a Puerto Rican politician affiliated with the Popular Democratic Party (PPD). He was elected to the Puerto Rico House of Representatives in 2012 to represent District 31.

References

External links
Jesús Santa Rodríguez Profile on WAPA-TV

Living people
1964 births
People from Caguas, Puerto Rico
Popular Democratic Party members of the House of Representatives of Puerto Rico